The XIX Smile is a Swiss single-place paraglider that was designed by Michi Kobler and produced by XIX GmbH of Kronbühl, introduced in 2003. It is now out of production.

Design and development
The Smile was designed as a beginner glider for the flight training role. The models are each named for their relative size.

Operational history
Reviewer Noel Bertrand described the Smile in a 2003 review as having, "all the quality of construction and performance of the more sophisticated XIX products".

Variants
Smile S
Small-sized model for lighter pilots. The glider model is Deutscher Hängegleiterverband e.V. (DHV) 1 certified.
Smile M
Mid-sized model for medium-weight pilots. The pilot weight range is {. The glider model is DHV 1 certified.
Smile L
Large-sized model for heavier pilots. The glider model is DHV 1 certified.

Specifications (Smile M)

References

Smile
Paragliders